The Coast Guard E Ribbon was established in September 1990 and is the United States Coast Guard equivalent to the Navy E Ribbon.

Also known as the Coast Guard Excellence Ribbon, the decoration is a unit award which is presented to the officers and crew of any Coast Guard cutter which earns the Operational Excellence Award during annual refresher training.

Subsequent awards for the Coast Guard E ribbon are denoted by a gold star.

See also
 Awards and decorations of the United States military

References

E Ribbon
Awards established in 1990
US Coast Guard ribbon symbolism